Majid Zahoor is a Pakistani politician who was a Member of the Provincial Assembly of the Punjab, from May 2013 to May 2018.

Early life
He was born on 5 April 1969.

Political career

He was elected to the Provincial Assembly of the Punjab as a candidate of Pakistan Muslim League (Nawaz) from Constituency PP-140 (Lahore-IV) in 2013 Pakistani general election.

References

Living people
Punjab MPAs 2013–2018
1969 births
Pakistan Muslim League (N) politicians